Viswanathan Anand (born 11 December 1969) and Vladimir Kramnik (born 25 June 1975) have played 93 classical chess games, of which Kramnik won eleven, Anand won eleven, and 71 games were drawn. In the rapid format Anand has 12 wins, Kramnik has 4 wins with 39 draws. In the blitz format Kramnik has 8 wins, Anand has 5 wins with 16 draws.

The World Chess Championship 2008 between the players was won by Anand.

Classical games

Rapid games

Blitz

Blindfold games

Advanced Chess

References

 
 Lifetime record between Anand and Kramnik at chessgames.com

Games between Anand and Kramnik
Chess rivalries